The Qingshui Temple (Chingshui Temple) also known as Tsushih Temple or the "Divine Progenitors Temple" is a temple in dedicated to the Deity known as Master Qingshui, a Northern Song dynasty Buddhist monk who is said to have saved a town from a drought and performed numerous miracles. The temple is located in the Wanhua District of Taipei City, Taiwan. The temple is often called "the most characteristic example of mid-Qing temple architecture."

History
The temple was constructed in 1787 CE. In 1958, the temple was renovated and restored.

Transportation
The temple is accessible within walking distance west of Ximen Station of Taipei Metro.

References 

1787 establishments in Taiwan
Religious buildings and structures completed in 1787
Buddhist temples in Taipei